Zaozerye is a rural locality (a village) in Semizerye Rural Settlement, Kaduysky District, Vologda Oblast, Russia. The population was 19 as of 2002. There are 14 streets.

Geography 
Zaozerye is located 14 km east of Kaduy (the district's administrative centre) by road. Glukhoye is the nearest rural locality.

References 

Rural localities in Kaduysky District